The fourth season of Teenage Mutant Ninja Turtles began airing on Nickelodeon on October 25, 2015. The season was ordered on June 17, 2014.

The four final episodes originally aired in South Korea during mid- and late-December 2016. This is the only season of the series that has aired over traditional two standard TV seasons, as well as the only season of the series where the 2-part finale aired in separate weeks.

Plot
After the Turtles, April, and Casey are saved from the destruction of Earth, the Fugitoid uses his spacecraft the Ulixes to turn back time to six months earlier in order for him and the Turtles to prevent the Triceraton Empire led by Emperor Zanmoran from assembling the three components of the Heart of Darkness that are scattered throughout the universe before everything on Earth is lost. Besides fighting the Triceratons, the Turtles also face new enemies in outer space like Lord Vringath Dregg of the planet Sectoid 1 and the bounty hunter Armaggon. The turtles also meet new allies, Commander G'Throkka (Sal Commander) and Lieutenant Y'Gythba (Mona Lisa), and even have an adventure with their interdimensional 1987 series counterparts and their enemy Krang who is an exiled relative of Kraang Subprime. Despite the efforts of the Turtles, the Triceratons are still able to collect all three pieces of the Black Hole Generator, only for the Turtles to return to Earth and join forces with their past selves to warn Splinter before he is killed by Shredder, stop the detonator of the Heart of Darkness, and defeat the Triceratons. The Fugitoid destroys the Black Hole Generator near the Triceraton space fleet, causing it to explode, presumably killing the Triceratons. In the aftermath of the fight against the Triceratons, the past versions of the Turtles, April, and Casey leave Earth with the past Fugitoid in the Ulixes while the present Fugitoid's head reactivates in Earth orbit. 

At one point during their adventures throughout the cosmos, April is given a fragment of the ancient Aeon's mystical Sol Star (containing the very essence of power and life itself), and which helps her in further developing her psychic abilities as well as drastically increasing them to incalculable levels; also due to the several training sessions she had with the Fugitoid. 

Weeks later following the Triceraton Invasion being thwarted and the Foot Clan's disappearance, April is promoted to kunoichi at the time when the witch Shinigami arrives and is revealed that she is Karai's friend as they plot to rebuild the Foot Clan and dispose of Shredder who is still recuperating from his last fight with Splinter. While Karai and Shinigami have some ninjas on their side, the Foot Clan strengthens the Footbot army by creating the Elite Footbots. Furthermore, some other crime organizations have been plotting to take over the Foot Clan's territory, and a crystal fragment of immeasurable mystical power (which April had received from an ancient benevolent race of aliens known as the Aeons) is beginning to exert quite a baneful influence on her. However, she eventually succeeds in overcoming its vast mystical power and shatters it. She then apologizes to her friends for not disregarding the universal influence the Sol Star fragment had on her, but assures everyone that she now has a better understand of how to control her increasingly powerful psionic abilities on her own. 

Using a special mutagen formula, Oroku Saki recuperates and becomes the Super Shredder in order to take back control of the Foot Clan from Karai, finish off Splinter and the Turtles, and even goes far enough to inject more unstable mutagen into himself. He ends up killing Splinter by stabbing him and throwing him off the building. Super Shredder is thrown into a garbage truck to be left for dead by Casey and April. However, he survives and begins to hunt the Turtles once again. Having had enough, the Turtles decide to end the long feud once and for all. After many obstacles, the Turtles face against Shredder, and Leonardo ends it by killing him.

With Splinter avenged and Shredder dead, the Turtles and their friends wonder about what lies ahead. Knowing the Foot isn't over yet and there are still enemies out there, the heroes prepare for the road ahead, knowing that Splinter is still with them, in spirit.

Production
After appearing in the two-part season 2 episode, The Manhattan Project, the 1987 series counterparts of the turtles also had a crossover episode with the turtles from the 2012 series in the "Trans-Dimensional Turtles" episode. In addition with Cam Clarke, Rob Paulsen, Townsend Coleman and Barry Gordon reprising their roles as the 1987 series Leonardo, Raphael, Michelangelo and Donatello, respectively, from the episodes, Pat Fraley also reprises his role as Krang from the 1987 series.

Episodes

Notes

References

4
2015 American television seasons
2016 American television seasons
Television series set on fictional moons
Television series set on fictional planets
Parallel universes in fiction
Crossover animation
2016 in South Korean television
2017 American television seasons
Robots in television
American children's animated space adventure television series
American children's animated comic science fiction television series